Siberian State Automobile and Highway University, (SibADI; , until 2017 Siberian State Automobile and Highway Academy, is a university in Omsk, Russia.

Omsk
Universities in Omsk Oblast
Technical universities and colleges in Russia